Charles Enge was a member of the Wisconsin State Assembly.

Biography
Enge was born on March 28, 1869 in Sauk County, Wisconsin. On June 13, 1900, he married Mina G. Gasser. They would have six children. Enge died on August 30, 1945 in Troy, Sauk County, Wisconsin. He is buried in Prairie du Sac, Wisconsin.

Career
Enge was a member of the Assembly from 1939 to 1940 after defeating George J. Woerth. He was a Republican. He also served on the school board and the Sauk County Board of Supervisors.

References

People from Sauk County, Wisconsin
School board members in Wisconsin
County supervisors in Wisconsin
Republican Party members of the Wisconsin State Assembly
1869 births
1945 deaths